Via Maris is one modern name for an ancient trade route, dating from the early Bronze Age, linking Egypt with the northern empires of Syria, Anatolia and Mesopotamia — along the Mediterranean coast of modern-day Egypt, Israel, Turkey and Syria. It is a historic road that runs in part along the Palestinian Mediterranean coast. It was the most important route from Egypt to Syria (the Fertile Crescent) which followed the coastal plain before crossing over into the plain of Jezreel and the Jordan valley.

One earlier name was "Way of the Philistines", a reference to a passageway through the Philistine Plain (which today consists of Israel's southern coastal plain and the Gaza Strip). Academic researchers prefer other names, for instance "International Trunk Road" or "International Coastal Highway" (also uncapitalised).

Together with the King's Highway, the Via Maris was one of the major trade routes connecting Egypt and the Levant with Anatolia and Mesopotamia. The Via Maris was crossed by other trading routes, so that one could travel from Africa to Europe or from Asia to Africa. It began in al-Qantara and went east to Pelusium, following the northern coast of Sinai through el-Arish and Rafah. From there it followed the coast of Canaan through Gaza, Ashkelon, Ashdod, Aphek avoiding the Yarkon River, and Dor before turning east again through Megiddo and the Jezreel Valley until it reached Tiberias on the Sea of Galilee. Again turning northward along the lake shore, the Via Maris passed through Migdal, Capernaum, and Hazor. From Hazor it crossed the northern River Jordan at what later became known as Jacob's Ford, then climbed sharply over the Golan Heights and wound its way northeast into Damascus. Here travellers could continue on the King's Highway as far as the Euphrates River or proceed northward into Anatolia.

Name and controversy
According to Anson Rainey (1981),
"Via Maris" is not the historical name of any road. The prophet was probably referring to the road from Dan to the sea at Tyre, passing through Abel-beth-maachah, which marked the northern border of Israel at the time of the Assyrian conquest.

The road mentioned in the traditional description is better listed as the Great Trunk Road. This Egypt-to-Damascus route is so designated by Barry J. Beitzel in The New Moody Atlas of the Bible (2009), p. 85, by John D. Currid and David P. Barrett in the ESV Bible Atlas (2010), p. 41, and by Rainey and Notley in Carta's New Century Handbook and Atlas of the Bible (2007), p. 76. Carl G. Rasmussen in the Zondervan Atlas of the Bible (2010), p. 32, also notes the traditional misnomer and denotes the Egypt–Damascus route as the International North-South Route.

Rasmussen, basically in agreement with Langfur and Rainey, suggests that the Via Maris was the road that connected Tyre with Damascus. Beitzel, in contrast, denotes the Via Maris as a road from Ptolemais (Acco / Acre) to Kedesh (Kedesh-naphtali) in the Galilee – also leading west to east, but slightly further south and not reaching so far inland.

See also

 Barid, Muslim postal network renewed during Mamluk period and connecting Cairo with Damascus
 King's Highway (ancient) – an alternative, more easterly ancient route between Egypt and Mesopotamia
 Salah al-Din Road – the main highway of the Gaza Strip, crossing the territory from north to south
 Way of the Patriarchs – the biblical north-to-south route through the mountains of Canaan
 Grand Trunk Road – one of Asia's oldest and longest major roads linking South Asia and Central Asia.

References

Trade routes
Ancient roads and tracks
Ancient Near East
Ancient Israel and Judah
Geography of Egypt
Geography of Palestine (region)
Geography of Syria
History of Palestine (region)
Latin words and phrases